The Phase Out Corporate Giveaways Interstate Compact is a proposed interstate compact in the United States that would commit signatory states to ending the economic development practice of providing targeted subsidies, tax abatements and other forms of financial incentives to private companies. It is frequently formally referred to as the "Agreement for Best Practices in Economic Development" in legislation. 

As of November 2021, 15 states had bills before their legislatures that would bind them to the Compact's requirement not to offer subsidies to businesses located in other signatory states, and three other states had had such legislation introduced in previous sessions. 

Versions of the Compact have been proposed by think tanks associated with free-market economic policies such as the Mercatus Center at George Mason University and the Mackinac Center for Public Policy.  However, support for the Compact has been broadly bipartisan, with left-wing think tanks such as the American Economic Liberties Project also supporting the Compact and both Republican and Democratic legislators sponsoring bills to join the Compact in their states. 

Legislators' statements and media reports generally suggest that interest in an interstate compact to end economic development "corporate welfare" was accelerated by the controversy surrounding the Amazon HQ2 bid process, by the subsidies given to Foxconn in Wisconsin and by a growing body of academic research questioning the effectiveness of such programs at creating jobs.

References

External link
 Coalition to Phase Out Corporate Tax Giveaways

United States interstate compacts